Magnus "Mange" Johansson (born September 4, 1973), is a former professional Swedish ice hockey player. He was a defenceman and captain for Linköpings HC in the highest Swedish league, Elitserien, and is a former member of the Chicago Blackhawks and Florida Panthers of the NHL and Atlant Moscow Oblast of the KHL

Playing career
Johansson started his senior playing career in his hometown team Linköpings HC in 1990. The club was then playing in Division 1 Södra, at the time one of Sweden's 2nd tier leagues, and Johansson who was appointed captain at an age of 18 would spend his first seven seasons there. In the 1996-97 season Linköpings HC was coached by Tommy Boustedt, and when his contract ended and he signed with the Elitserien team Västra Frölunda HC, he brought Johansson with him. Despite his relatively small stature Johansson adapted well to professional hockey, and over the following six seasons he developed into one of the league's most productive defencemen. After winning the Swedish championship with Västra Frölunda in 2003, Johansson signed a one-year contract with SCL Tigers of the Swiss Nationalliga A.

In March 2004, Linköpings HC, now in Elitserien, announced that Johansson had signed a 4-year contract and would make his, by the fans, long-awaited return to the club. Once again wearing the captain's C, he led his team to results never accomplished before in the club's history in the following three seasons; a second spot in the league in 2004-05, to the playoff semifinals in 2006 and to the finals in 2007.

In June 2007 Johansson agreed a one-year contract with NHL side, the Chicago Blackhawks. He played half the season with the Hawks that year before being traded to the Florida Panthers for a draft pick.

On July 24, 2008, he signed a contract with Atlant Mytishchi of the Kontinental Hockey League. In April 2009, Johansson returned to Linköpings HC and was again chosen as the team's captain.

On 17 September 2011, Johansson scored his 394th point in Elitserien. This made him the highest scoring defenceman in Elitserien history. He had already made the most assists as a defenceman in Elitserien history during the previous 2010–11 season.

Following the 2014-15 season, Johansson announced his retirement after 25 professional seasons.

International play
From May 5–21, 2006, Johansson was an alternate captain on the Swedish team that won the gold medals at the 2006 World Championships and on May 13, 2007 in the bronze medal game of the 2007 World Championships, which Sweden lost to Russia.

Records
Frölunda HC club record for points in a regular season, defenceman (35), 2001–02, 50-game schedule
Linköpings HC club record for points in a regular season, defenceman (49), 2009–10, 55-game schedule
Linköpings HC club record for goals in a regular season, defenceman (11), 2005–06, 50-game schedule
Linköpings HC club record for assists in a regular season, defenceman (41), 2009–10, 55-game schedule
Linköpings HC club record for goals in a playoff season, defenceman (6), 2009–10

Career statistics

Regular season and playoffs

International

References

External links

 
 Swedish Ice Hockey Association official statistics

1973 births
Atlant Moscow Oblast players
Chicago Blackhawks players
Expatriate ice hockey players in Russia
Florida Panthers players
Frölunda HC players
Ice hockey players at the 2010 Winter Olympics
Linköping HC players
Living people
Olympic ice hockey players of Sweden
Sportspeople from Linköping
SCL Tigers players
Swedish expatriate sportspeople in Russia
Swedish expatriate sportspeople in Switzerland
Swedish ice hockey defencemen
Undrafted National Hockey League players
Sportspeople from Östergötland County
Swedish expatriate ice hockey players in the United States
Expatriate ice hockey players in Switzerland